Hadley is the primary hamlet and a census-designated place (CDP) within the town of Hadley, Saratoga County, New York, United States. As of the 2010 census, the population was 1,009, out of 1,971 residents in the entire town of Hadley. Before that, the community was part of the Lake Luzerne-Hadley census-designated place.

Hadley CDP is in northern Saratoga County, in the southeastern part of its town. It is bordered to the east by the Hudson River, across which is the town of Lake Luzerne in Warren County. The Sacandaga River forms the southern edge of Hadley, joining the Hudson at the community's southeastern corner.

Demographics

References 

Census-designated places in Saratoga County, New York
Census-designated places in New York (state)